Helen Sear (born 1955) is a Welsh-based photographic artist known for being the first female Welsh artist to hold a solo exhibition at the 2015 Venice Biennale and for her exhibit at the 1991 British Council exhibition. An alumni at University of Reading, she has received several awards for her work.

Early life
Helen Sear was born in Gloucestershire in 1955. Her father was a surgeon who taught her about nature.

Career
Sear studied Fine Art at Reading University and University College London, Slade School. In the late 1980s she worked primarily through installation, performance and film. Her photographic works were included in the 1991 British Council exhibition "De-Composition: Constructed Photography in Britain", which toured Latin America and Eastern Europe.

The artist received an Abbey Award in 1993 at the British School at Rome. She won joint first prize for visual art at the National Eisteddfod in Wales in 2011,  and was the recipient of an Arts Council of Wales Creative Wales Award to develop new work.  Ffotogallery, Wales' national agency for photography published her first major monograph in 2012, Inside the View, which was nominated for best international photography book at Photo Espana. In 2013 she was awarded the Wakelin Award for her work Chameleon, which will remain part of the contemporary art collection at Glynn Vivian Art Gallery and museum.

She is represented by Klompching Gallery in New York, and is currently Reader in Photography and Fine Art at University of South Wales, Newport.

Her work focuses on ideas of vision, touch, and the re-presentation of the nature of experience, with particular reference to bodies and the immediate environment in rural Wales and France.

In 2015, Sear was selected to make a solo presentation for Wales at the 56th Venice Biennale 2015.

Notable exhibitions

Solo exhibitions
Gone to Earth, John Hansard Gallery, Southampton, 1994
Twice... Once, Anderson O’Day London, 1998
Zelda Cheatle Gallery, 2000
'Inside The View', Klompching Gallery, New York USA, 2009 
Beyond The View', Klompching Gallery, New York USA, 2010
Display, G39 Cardiff, 2009
Beyond The View, Bildkultur, Stuttgart, 2012
'Sightlines and Pastoral Monuments', Klompching Gallery, New York USA 2012 
Lure, Oriel Davies national touring exhibition, 2013
Pastoral Monuments, Les Rencontres Internationales, Gaspésie Canada, 2014
'Helen Sear', Klompchng Gallery, New York USA 2015 
'Helen Sear: New Work', Klompching Gallery, New York USA 2017

Group exhibitions
British Council touring Exhibition De-Composition, constructed photography in Britain. 1991–1998
Moments of Capture, Museum of Modern Art, Skopje, Macedonia
A Quality of Light, Office of Art project, Tate Gallery, St. Ives, 1997
Here to Stay, Arts Council of England purchases from the 1990s Lausanne, Switzerland, 1998
Je t’envisage, la disparition du portrait: Musée de L’Elysée,
About Face, Hayward Gallery, London, 2004
La Mirada Reflexiva, Espai D’Art Contemporani de Castellon, Spain, (with Robert Longo and Perejaume ), 2005
Nothing Is In The Place, Kraków (Photo month), 2010
We Have The Mirrors, We Have The Plans: Oriel Mostyn, Llanduddno, Wales, 2010
Paris Photo, Aperture Foundation New York, 2011
Portmanteau, Halle 14 Leipzig, 2011
Hijacked 111, Derby Quad, 2012
New Perspectives: Landscape Art in Wales since the 1970s, National Museum Wales, 2012
 Royal Academy of Arts Summer Exhibition, London, 2014

Publications
Natural’s Not in It John Slyce Portfolio no. 35 (2002)
Face. The New Photographic Portrait. Thames and Hudson (2006) 
Inside the View (2012)
Brisées (2013)

References

External links
 
 Klompching

Welsh women photographers
Welsh artists
Alumni of the University of Reading
Alumni of the Slade School of Fine Art
People associated with the University of South Wales
1955 births
Living people
Welsh contemporary artists